Raoul François Casimir Van Overstraeten (Ath, 29 January 1885—Brussels, 30 January 1977) was a Belgian general who fought during the First World War and Second World War and, from 1938 to 1940, military adviser of king Leopold III of Belgium.

Early life 
Van Overstraeten spoke Dutch and French fluently, since his father was a Fleming and his mother a Wallonian. Furthermore, he spoke English and German. His father was an officer at the infantry and ended his career as a general.

First World War 
During the German invasion of Belgium, Van Overstraeten was a part of the first line in Liège. He participated in the Battle of Halen, the siege of Antwerp, and the Race to the Sea. In 1916, he went to the Belgian Congo as a volunteer and participated in the Battle of Tabora under general Charles Tombeur in German East Africa.

Second World War 
From 1938 to 1940, Raoul Van Overstraeten was the military adviser of King Leopold III. He refused the function of chief of staff. Minister Paul-Henri Spaak characterised him as "by far the most intelligent of all military personnel. The drawback is that he knows it himself."

After the German invasion of Belgium in 1940, he remained in the country, living in Brussels, and was not interned by the occupying forces. On 19 November 1940, Leopold III met Adolf Hitler in Berchtesgaden. Van Overstraeten organised the meeting.

In 1944, Van Overstraeten, mistrusted by the Allies, was passed over for a leading role in the reconstituted Belgian armed forces. Two years later, he retired, and subsequently wrote four books based on his archives.

Publications

References

1885 births
1977 deaths
Belgian Army generals of World War II
Belgian Army personnel of World War I
Officers of the Force Publique
Historians of Belgium